Áslaug Munda Gunnlaugsdóttir (born 2 June 2001) is an Icelandic footballer who plays for Breiðablik and the Iceland women's national football team.

Career

Early career
Áslaug started playing youth football in the town of Egilsstaðir before playing her first senior team games with Völsungur from Húsavík at the age of 15. In 2018, she joined Úrvalsdeild kvenna club Breiðablik.

International
Áslaug made her national team debut in June 2019 against Finland.

Titles
 Úrvalsdeild kvenna: 
2018
 Icelandic Cup: 
2018
 Icelandic Super Cup: 
2019
 Icelandic League Cup: 
2019

References

External links
 
 

2001 births
Living people
Aslaug Munda Gunnlaugsdottir
Aslaug Munda Gunnlaugsdottir
Aslaug Munda Gunnlaugsdottir
Women's association footballers not categorized by position
UEFA Women's Euro 2022 players